For the April 1945 invasion of Okinawa (Allied codename: Operation Iceberg), the Allies assembled the most powerful naval force in history. Since the few remaining capital ships of the Imperial Japanese Combined Fleet had been sunk or otherwise put out of action at the Battle of Leyte Gulf, the Allies were effectively unopposed in terms of major surface vessels; a single mission consisting of the superbattleship  and a few escorts was undertaken, but the task force did not get within  of the invasion area. The main Japanese naval opposition within the invasion area came from hundreds of Imperial Japanese Navy Shin'yō-class suicide motorboats and Maru-Ni Imperial Japanese Army attack boats.

Since the Japanese air arm had been equally decimated by this point in the war, the lack of trained and experienced pilots led them to deploy the kamikaze extensively in the waters off Okinawa.

 US Navy combat ships:
11 fleet carriers, 6 light carriers, 22 escort carriers, 8 fast battleships, 10 old battleships, 2 large cruisers, 12 heavy cruisers, 13 light cruisers, 4 anti-aircraft light cruisers, 132 destroyers, 45 destroyer escorts

 Amphibious assault vessels:
84 attack transports, 29 attack cargo ships, LCIs, LSMs, LSTs, LSVs, etc.

 Auxiliaries:
52 submarine chasers, 23 fast minesweepers, 69 minesweepers, 11 minelayers, 49 oilers, etc.

 Royal Navy combat ships:
5 fleet carriers, 2 battleships, 7 light cruisers, 14 destroyers

Losses
The smaller ships were least able to withstand damage from kamikaze attacks.
 2 to mines: , 
 1 to collision:

Allied command structure

Naval 
The roles of Commander in Chief, Pacific Ocean Areas (CINCPOA) and Commander in Chief, U.S. Pacific Fleet (CINCPAC), were both exercised by Admiral Chester W. Nimitz from his headquarters at Pearl Harbor, Hawaii.

Since the "Big Blue Fleet" was at this time under the command of Admiral Raymond Spruance aboard his flagship , the force was designated Fifth Fleet. (It had been Third Fleet until Spruance relieved Admiral William Halsey in January, as part of the "alternating command" system).

The ships and troops of Operation Iceberg were under direct operational command of Rear Admiral Richmond Kelly Turner aboard amphibious command ship .

Ground troops 
Son of a Confederate army general, Lt. Gen. Simon Bolivar Buckner, Jr. was one of four US lieutenant generals to die during World War II, but the only one to die by enemy action. On 18 June, Buckner was visiting a forward observation post when a Japanese artillery shell struck a coral outcropping, fragments of which struck Buckner in the chest. Command of Tenth Army passed to Marine Maj. Gen. Roy S. Geiger.
United States Tenth Army (Lt. Gen. Simon Bolivar Buckner, Jr. (KIA))
Tactical Air Force, Tenth Army - MajGen Francis P. Mulcahy/MajGen Louis E. Woods
 III Amphibious Corps (Maj. Gen. Roy S. Geiger)
 Left beaches: 6th Marine Division (Maj. Gen. Lemuel C. Shepherd, Jr.)
 Right beaches: 1st Marine Division (Maj. Gen. Pedro A. del Valle)
 XXIV Army Corps (Maj. Gen. John R. Hodge)
 Left beaches: 7th Infantry ("Bayonet") Division (Maj. Gen. A.V. Arnold)
 Right beaches: 96th Infantry ("Deadeye") Division (Maj. Gen. J.L. Bradley)
 Landed L+8: 27th Infantry ("New York") Division (Maj. Gen. G.W. Griner, Jr.)

Allied amphibious forces

Joint Expeditionary Force (Task Force 51) 

Vice Admiral Richmond Kelly Turner in amphibious command ship Eldorado

 Western Islands Attack Group (Task Group 51.1)

 Rear Admiral I.N. Kiland in amphibious command ship Mount McKinley
 Embarking 77th Infantry ("Statue of Liberty") Division andone Marine BLT (Maj. Gen. Andrew D. Bruce, USA)
 Transport Group "Fox"
 Commodore T.B. Brittain
 Transport Division 49
 4 attack transports: Chilton, LaGrange, Tazewell, St. Mary's
 2 attack cargos: Oberon, Torrance
 Transport Division 50
 4 attack transports: Henrico, Pitt, Natrona, Drew
 1 attack cargo: Tate
 1 evacuation transport: Rixey
 Transport Division 51
 5 attack transports: Goodhue, Eastland, Telfair, Mountrail, Montrose
 2 attack cargos: Wyandot, Suffolk
 Reconnaissance section
 2 destroyer transports: Scribner, Kinzer
 Western Islands Tractor Flotilla: 18 LSTs
 Western Islands Reserve Tractor Group: 10 LSTs
 Western Islands LSM Group: 11 LSMs
 Western Islands Control Unit: 7 submarine chasers: (3 steel hull, 4 wooden hull)
 Western Islands Support Craft Flotilla
 Mortar support divisions 6, 7, 8
 RCM and Rocket Division 3
 Gunboat Support Divisions 1, 3, 4, 5
 LSM(R) Group
 Western Islands Hydrographic Survey Group: 4 submarine chasers (steel hull)
 Western Island Service & Salvage Unit
 1 salvage vessel: Clamp
 1 landing craft repair ship: Egeria
 2 fleet tugs: Yuma, Tekesta
 2 LCI(L)s
 1 LCT

 Screen
 Captain Frederick Moosbrugger in amphibious command ship Biscayne
 8 destroyers
 8  (5 x 5-in. main battery): Picking, Sproston, Wickes, William D. Porter, Isherwood, Kimberly, Luce, Charles J. Badger
 6 destroyer escorts
 3 John C. Butler-class (2 x 5-in. main battery): Richard W. Suesens, Abercrombie, Oberrender
 3 Cannon-class (3 x 3-in. main battery): Riddle, Swearer, Stern
 3 destroyer transports: Humphreys, Herbert, Dickerson

 Demonstration Group "Charlie" (Task Group 51.2)
 Rear Admiral Jerauld Wright
 Embarking Demonstration Landing Force (2nd Marine Division), Major General Thomas E. Watson, USMC
 Transport Squadron 15
 5 attack transports: Bayfield, Mellette, Hendry, Sibley, Berrien
 3 attack cargos: Shoshone, Theenim, Southampton
 1 evacuation transport: Pinkney

Northern Attack Force (Task Force 53) 

Rear Admiral Lawrence F. Reifsnider in amphibious command ship Panamint
Embarking  III Amphibious Corps (Maj. Gen. Roy S. Geiger, USMC)

 Transport Group "Able" (Task Group 53.1)
 Commodore H.B. Knowles
 Embarking  6th Marine Division (Maj. Gen. Lemuel C. Shepherd, Jr., USMC)
 Transport Division 34
 6 attack transports: Cambria, Marvin H. McIntyre, Adair, Gage, Noble, Gilliam
 2 attack cargos: Sheliak, Hydrus
 Transport Division 35
 5 attack transports: Clay, Leon, George Clymer, Arthur Middleton, Catron
 2 attack cargos: Caswell, Devosa
 Transport Division 36
 5 attack transports: Monrovia, Wayne, Sumter, Menifee, Fuller
 3 attack cargos: Aquarius, Circe, Casa Grande
 1 vehicle landing ship: Catskill

 Transport Group "Baker" (Task Group 53.2)
 Commodore J. G. Moyer
 Embarking  1st Marine Division (Maj. Gen. Pedro A. del Valle, USMC)
 Transport Division 52
 8 attack transports: Burleigh, McCracken, Thomas Jefferson, Charles Carroll, Barnett, Andromeda, Cepheus, Oak Hill
 1 vehicle landing ship: Monitor
 Transport Division 53
 5 attack transports: Marathon, Rawlins, Renville, New Kent, Burleson
 2 attack cargos: Centaurus, Arcturus
 Transport Division 54
 5 attack transports: Dade, Magoffin, Navarro, Effingham, Joseph T. Dickman
 3 attack cargos: Betelgeuse, Procyon, White Marsh

 Northern Tractor Flotilla (Task Group 53.3)
 Capt. J. S. Laidlaw
 Tractor Group "Able": 16 LSTs carrying 6 LCTs, 22 pontoon barges and 6 pontoon causeways; 7 LSMs
 Tractor Group "Baker": 16 LSTs carrying 10 LCTs, 16 pontoon barges and 6 pontoon causeways
 Tractor Group "Charlie": 14 LSTs carrying 20 pontoon barges; 8 LSMs
 Northern Control Group: 18 submarine chasers (4 steel hull, 9 wooden hull, 5 sweeper type), Northern Beach Party

 Northern Attack Force Screen (Task Group 53.6)
 Captain J. H. Wellings

 13 destroyers
 2  (6 x 5-in. main battery): Massey, Hugh W. Hadley
 4  (5 x 5-in. main battery): Pringle, Hutchins, Stanly, Howorth
 4  (4 x 5-in. main battery): Lang, Stack, Sterett, Wilson
 3  (5 x 5-in. main battery): Morris, Mustin, Russell
 5 destroyer escorts
 4  (3 x 3-in. main battery): Gendreau, Fieberling, William C. Cole, Paul G. Baker
 1  (3 x 3-in. main battery): Bebas
 2 destroyer transports: Charles Lawrence, Roper
 3 submarine chasers (2 escort type, 1 wooden hull)

 Northern Defense Group (Task Group 53.7)
 Capt. W. W. Weeden
 Embarking Marine Corps support units and high priority cargo: 21 LSTs carrying LCT and pontoon causeways
 2 oil storage ships: Elk, Camel
 1  (3 x 3-in. main battery) destroyer escort: Fair
 2 submarine chasers (wooden hull), 7 motor minesweepers

Southern Attack Force (Task Force 55) 

Rear Admiral John L. Hall in amphibious command ship Teton
Embarking  XXIV Army Corps (Maj. Gen. John R. Hodge)

 Transport Group "Dog" (Task Group 55.1)
 Commodore M.O. Carlson
 Embarking  7th Infantry ("Bayonet") Division (Maj. Gen. Archibald V. Arnold, USA)
 Transport Division 37
 4 attack transports: Harris, Lamar, Sheridan, Pierce
 1 attack cargo: Algorab
 Transport Division 38
 4 attack transports: Barnstable, Elmore, Alpine, Lycoming
 1 attack cargo: Alshain
 1 landing ship dock: Epping Forest
 Transport Division 39
 4 attack transports: Custer, Freestone, Kittson, Baxter
 2 attack cargos: Algol, Arneb
 Transport Division 13
 4 attack transports: Appling, Butte, Audrain, Laurens
 2 attack cargos: Aurelia, Corvus
 1 vehicle landing ship: Ozark
 Tractor Group "Dog"
 16 LSTs, 12 LSMs, 2 LCIs
 Tractor Group "Fox"
 14 LSTs carrying LCTs and pontoon barges, 10 LSMs

 Transport Group "Easy" (Task Group 55.2)
 Commodore C.G. Richardson
 Embarking  96th Infantry ("Deadeye") Division (Maj. Gen. James L. Bradley, USA)
 Transport Division 40
 4 attack transports: Mendocino, Sarasota, Haskell, Oconto
 2 attack cargos: Capricornus, Chara
 1 landing ship dock: Lindenwald
 Transport Division 41
 4 attack transports: Olmstead, La Porte, Fond du Lac, Banner
 2 attack cargos: Diphda, Uvalde
 Transport Division 42
 4 attack transports: Neshoba, Oxford, Latimer, Edgecombe
 1 attack cargo: Virgo
 1 landing ship dock: Gunston Hall
 Transport Division 14
 4 attack transports: Allendale, Meriwether, Menard, Kenton
 1 attack cargo: Achernar
 Tractor Group "Easy": 23 LSTs, 5 LSMs
 Beach Party "Easy", Southern Beach Party
 15 submarine chasers: 4 steel hull, 7 wooden hull, 4 sweeper type
 17 LCS(L)s, 6 LSM(R)s

 Screen (Task Group 55.6)
 Captain E.W. Young
 13 destroyers
 4  (6 x 5-in. main battery): Hyman, Purdy, Wadsworth, Putnam
 9  (5 x 5-in. main battery): Anthony, Bache,  Bush, Mullany, Bennett, Hudson, Beale, Ammen, Rooks
 6 destroyer escorts
 2  (3 x 3-in. main battery):  Crouter, Carlson,
 2  (3 x 3-in. main battery): Damon M. Cummings, Vammen
 1  (3 x 3-in. main battery): O'Neill
 1  (2 x 5-in. main battery): Walter C. Wann
 1 destroyer transport
 Sims

 Southern Defense Group (Task Group 55.7)
 Commander B.T. Zelenka
 1  destroyer escort: Manlove
 1 destroyer transport: Stringham
 34 LSTs, 14 LSMs, 6 motor minesweepers, 2 LCIs 1 oil storage ship: Grumium Expeditionary Troops (Task Force 56) 

Lieutenant General Simon Bolivar Buckner, Jr., USA (KIA 18 June)
Consisting of  United States Tenth Army
 Northern Landing Area  III Amphibious Corps (Embarked in Task Force 53)
 Maj. Gen. Roy S. Geiger, USMC
 Left beaches: 6th Marine Division (Maj. Gen. Lemuel C. Shepherd, Jr., USMC)
 Right beaches: 1st Marine Division (Maj. Gen. Pedro A. del Valle, USMC)
 Southern Landing Area  XXIV Army Corps (Embarked in Task Force 55)
 Maj. Gen. John R. Hodge, USA
 Left beaches: 7th Infantry ("Bayonet") Division (Maj. Gen. Archibald V. Arnold, USA)
 Right beaches: 96th Infantry ("Deadeye") Division (Maj. Gen. James L. Bradley, USA)
 Landed L+8: 27th Infantry ("New York") Division (Maj. Gen. George W. Griner, Jr., USA)
 Western Islands Landed L+26: 77th Infantry ("Statue of Liberty") Division and one Marine BLT (Maj. Gen. Andrew D. Bruce, USA)

 Allied combat ships 

 Amphibious Support Forces (Task Force 52) 

Rear Admiral William H.P. Blandy in amphibious command ship Estes Support Carrier Group (Task Group 52.1)
 Rear Admiral Calvin T. Durgin

 Unit One
 Rear Admiral Clifton A.F. Sprague
 7 escort carriers
 Makin Island (Capts. W.B. Whaley and I.E. Hobbs)
 VC-84 (Lt. D.K. English, USNR), 27 aircraft
 16 FM-2 Wildcat fighters
 11 TBM Avenger torpedo bombers
 Fanshaw Bay (Capt. M.E. Arnold)
 VOC-2 (Lt. Cmdr. R.M. Allison), 30 aircraft
 24 FM-2 Wildcat fighters
   6 TBM Avenger torpedo bombers
 Lunga Point (Capt. G.A.T. Washburn)
 VC-85 (Lt. Cmdr. F.C. Herriman), 30 aircraft
 18 FM-2 Wildcat fighters
 12 TBM Avenger torpedo bombers
 Sangamon (Capts. M.E. Browder and A.I. Malstrom)
 Air Group 33 (Cmdr. F.B. Gilkeson), 30 aircraft
 24 F6F Hellcat fighters
   6 TBM Avenger torpedo bombers
 Natoma Bay (Capts. Albert K. Morehouse and B.B. Nichol)
 VC-81 (Lt. Cmdr. W.B. Morton, USNR), 32 aircraft
 20 FM-2 Wildcat fighters
 12 TBM Avenger torpedo bombers
 Savo Island (Capt. W.D. Anderson)
 VC-91 (Lt. F.M. Blanchard, USNR), 35 aircraft
 20 FM-2 Wildcat fighters
 15 TBM Avenger torpedo bombers
 Anzio (Capt. G.C. Montgomery)
 VC-13 (Lt. Cmdr. R.P. Williams, USNR), 24 aircraft
 12 FM-2 Wildcat fighters
 12 TBM Avenger torpedo bombers
 Screen (Commander J.C. Zahm)
 6 destroyers
 1  (6 x 5-in. main battery): Ingraham 3  (5 x 5-in. main battery): Boyd, Bradford, Hart 2  (4 x 5-in. main battery): Bagley, Patterson 11 destroyer escorts
 9  (2 x 5-in. main battery): Lawrence C. Taylor, Melvin R. Nawman, Oliver Mitchell, Robert F. Keller, Tabberer, Richard M. Rowell, Richard S. Bull, Dennis, O'Flaherty 2  (3 x 3-in. main battery):  Sederstrom, Fleming Unit Two

 Rear Admiral Felix B. Stump
 7 escort carriers
 Saginaw Bay (Capts. F.C. Sutton and Robert Goldwaite)
 VC-88 (Lt. E.L. Kemp, USNR), 32 aircraft
 20 FM-2 Wildcat fighters
 12 TBM Avenger torpedo bombers
 Sargent Bay (Capt. R.M. Oliver)
 VC-83 (Lt. Cmdr. B.V. Gates (KIA) and Lt. M.S. Worley, USNR), 28 aircraft
 16 FM-2 Wildcat fighters
 12 TBM Avenger torpedo bombers
 Rudyerd Bay (Capts. C.S. Smiley and J.G. Foster)
 VC-96 (Lt. Cmdr. W.S. Woollen, USNR), 31 aircraft
 20 FM-2 Wildcat fighters
 11 TBM Avenger torpedo bombers
 Marcus Island (Capt. H.V. Hopkins)
 VC-87 (Lt. H.N. Heisel), 32 aircraft
 20 FM-2 Wildcat fighters
 12 TBM Avenger torpedo bombers
 Petrof Bay (Capt. R.S. Clarke)
 VC-93 (Lt. Cmdr. C.P. Smith), 28 aircraft
 16 FM-2 Wildcat fighters
 12 TBM Avenger torpedo bombers
 Tulagi (Capts. J.C. Cronin & W.V. Davis)
 VC-92 (Lt. Cmdr. J.B. Wallace), 31 aircraft
 19 FM-2 Wildcat fighters
 12 TBM Avenger torpedo bombers
 Wake Island (Capt. A.V. Magly)
 VOC-1 (Lt. Cmdr. W.F. Bringie), 32 aircraft
 26 FM-2 Wildcat fighters
   6 TBM Avenger torpedo bombers
 Screen (Captain G.P. Hunter)
 4 destroyers
 1  (6 x 5-in. main battery): Lowry 3  (5 x 5-in. main battery): Capps, Evans, John D. Henley 6 destroyer escorts
 4  (2 x 5-in. main battery): William Seiverling, Ulvert M. Moore (Lt. Cmdr. Franklin D. Roosevelt Jr., USNR), Kendall C. Campbell, Goss 2  (3 x 3-in. main battery): Tisdale, Eisele Unit Three

 Rear Admiral William D. Sample
 4 escort carriers
 Suwannee (Capt. D.S. Cornwell)
 Air Group 40 (Lt. Cmdr. R.D. Sampson (KIA) and Lt. Cmdr. J.C. Longino), 27 aircraft
 17 F6F Hellcat fighters
 10 TBM Avenger torpedo bombers
 Chenango (Capts. George van Deurs and Harry D. Felt)
 Air Group 25 (Lt. Cmdr. R.W. Robinson (KIA), Lt. B. Phillips and Lt. Cmdr. P.M. Paul), 30 aircraft
 18 F6F Hellcat fighters
 12 TBM Avenger torpedo bombers
 Santee (Capt. J.V. Peterson)
 Air Group 24 (Lt. Cmdr. R.J. Ostrom (KIA) and Lt. P.N. Charbonnet), 30 aircraft
 18 F6F Hellcat fighters
 12 TBM Avenger torpedo bombers
 Steamer Bay (Capt. J.B. Paschal)
 VC-90 (Lt. Cmdr. R.A. O'Neill), 31 aircraft
 19 FM-2 Wildcat fighters
 12 TBM Avenger torpedo bombers
 Screen (Captain Alvin Duke Chandler)
 5 destroyers
 1  (6 x 5-in. main battery): Drexler 3  (5 x 5-in. main battery): Metcalf, Fullam, Guest 1  (4 x 5-in. main battery): Helm 2 destroyer escorts
 2  (2 x 5-in. main battery): John C. Butler, Edmonds Special Escort Carrier Group

 Captain C.L. Lee (arriving 4 April)
 4 escort carriers
 Hollandia (Capt. Lee)
 White Plains (Capt. D.J. Sullivan and Frederick Funke)
 Sitkoh Bay (Capts. R.G. Lockhart and J.P. Walker)
 Breton (Capt. Frank Obeirne)
 Marine Air Group 31 (Col. John C. Munn, USMC)
 Marine Air Group 33 (Col. W. E. Dickey USMC)
 192 F4U Corsair and 30 F6F Hellcat fighters to operate from Okinawa airfields
 Screen (Commander R.A. Wilhelm, USNR)
 4 destroyer transports: Kilty, Manley, George E. Badger, Greene Mine Flotilla (Task Group 52.2)

 Rear Admiral Alexander Sharp and Captain R. P. Whitemarsh in Terror Destroyer Minesweeper Group (Task Group 52.3)
 Capt. R.A. Larkin
 13 fast minesweepers (ex-destroyers): Forrest, Hobson, Macomb, Dorsey, Hopkins, Ellyson, Hambleton, Rodman, Emmons, Butler, Gherardi, Jeffers, Harding 3 fast minelayers (ex-destroyers): Gwin, Lindsey, Aaron Ward Minesweeper Group One (Task Group 52.4)
 Captain T.F. Donohue
 18  minesweepers: Champion, Heed, Defense, Devastator, Ardent, Requisite, Revenge, Pursuit, Sage, Sheldrake, Skylark, Starling, Swallow  Gladiator, Impeccable, Spear, Triumph, Vigilance 4 fast minelayers (ex-destroyers): Adams, Tolman, Henry A. Wiley, Shea 3 submarine chasers (steel hull): PC-1128, PC-1179, PC-1598
 Minesweeper Group Two (Task Group 52.5)
 Captain L. F. Freiburghouse
 18  minesweepers: Skirmish, Staunch, Signet, Scurry, Spectacle, Spector, Superior, Serene, Shelter, Strategy, Strength, Success, Ransom, Diploma, Density, Facility, Rebel, Recruit 2 fast minelayers (ex-destroyers): Tracy, J. William Ditter 3 motor gunboats (steel hull): PGM-9, PGM-10, PGM-11
 Reserve Sweep Group (Task Group 52.7)
 Cmdrs. E.D. McEathron and J.W. Wyckoff
 6  minesweepers: Buoyant, Gayety, Design, Device, Hazard, Execute Reinforced by the following in May:
 2  minesweepers: Fixity, Dour 8  minesweepers: Chief, Competent, Token, Zeal, Strive, Oracle, Velocity, Prevail 14 motor minesweepers
 4 destroyer transports with sweep gear-equipped landing craft personnel, ramped (LCP(R)s) embarked: Reeves, Daniel T. Griffin, Waters, Sims 2 minelayers: Weehawken, Monadnock 1 repair ship: Mona Island Net and Buoy Group (Task Group 52.8)
 Cmdr. G. C. King, USNR
 9  net laying ships: Snowbell, Terebinth, Corkwood, Spicewood, Cliffrose, Stagbush, Abele, Winterberry, Pinon 3  net laying ships: Mahogany, Aloe, Chinquapin 1 mine and net laying ship: Keokuk 2 net cargo ships: Sagittarius, Tuscana Gunfire and Covering Force (Task Force 54) 

Rear Admiral Morton L. Deyo in battleship 
 Unit One (Rear Admiral Peter K. Fischler)
 2 battleships: , 
 1 heavy cruiser: 
 Unit Two (Rear Admiral C. Turner Joy)
 2 battleships: , 
 2 heavy cruisers: , 
 1 : 
 Unit Three (Rear Admiral Bertram J. Rodgers)
 2 battleships: , 
 1 heavy cruiser: 
 2 light cruisers: , 
 1  destroyer: 
 Unit Four (Rear Admiral Lynde D. McCormick)
 2 battleships: , 
 2 heavy cruisers: , 
 
 Unit Five (Rear Admiral Allan E. Smith)
 Battleship Division 3 (George L. Weyler): 2 battleships: , 
 Cruiser Division 5 (Allan E. Smith): 2 heavy cruisers: , 
 Unit Six (Commander W.B. Hinds, USNR)
 2  destroyer escorts: , 
 Reported to TF 54 after L-day
 1 battleship: 
 1 heavy cruiser: 
 
 1  destroyer: 
 1 fast minesweeper: 

 British Carrier Force (Task Force 57) 

Vice Admiral Sir Bernard Rawlings, RN

 First Aircraft Carrier Squadron (Task Group 57.2)
 Rear Admiral Sir Philip L. Vian, RN
 5 fleet carriers
  (Capt. J.A.S. Eccles, RN), 44 aircraft
 29 F6F Hellcat fighters
 15 TBF Avenger torpedo bombers
  (Capt. M.M. Denny, RN), 53 aircraft
 37 F4U Corsair fighters
 14 TBF Avenger torpedo bombers
   2 Supermarine Walrus scout planes
  (Capt. C.E. Lambe, RN), 52 aircraft
 36 F4U Corsair fighters
 16 TBF Avenger torpedo bombers
  (Capt. Q.D. Graham, RN), 69 aircraft
 40 Supermarine Seafire fighters
 20 TBF Avenger torpedo bombers
   9 Fairey Firefly fighters
  (Capt. P. Ruck-Keene, RN), 43 aircraft
 28 F4U Corsair fighters
 15 TBF Avenger torpedo bombers

 First Battle Squadron (Task Group 57.1)
 Vice Admiral Rawlings
 2 battleships
  (10 x 14 in. main battery)
  (10 x 14 in. main battery)

 Fourth Cruiser Squadron (Task Group 57.4)
 Rear Admiral E.J.P. Brind
 7 light cruisers
 2  (12 x 6 in. main battery): , 
 1  (9 x 6 in. main battery): 
 1  (8 x 6 in. main battery): 

 Screen (Task Group 57.8)
 Rear Admiral J.H. Edelston
   4th Destroyer Flotilla
 24th Destroyer Flotilla
 25th Destroyer Flotilla
 27th Destroyer Flotilla

 British Fleet Train (Task Force 112)
 Rear Admiral D.B. Fisher, RN
 70+ auxiliaries including repair ships, oilers, minesweepers, hospital ships, etc.

 Fast Carrier Force (Task Force 58) 

Vice Admiral Marc A. Mitscher in fleet carrier  Task Group 58.1

 Rear Admiral Joseph J. Clark

 3 fleet carriers
 Hornet (Capt. Austin K. Doyle)
 Air Group 17 (Cmdr. E.G. Konrad), 101 aircraft
 VF-17: 71 F6F Hellcat fighters
 VB-17: 15 SB2C Helldiver dive bombers
 VT-17: 15 TBM Avenger torpedo bombers
 Wasp (Capts. O.A. Weller and W.G. Switzer)
 Air Group 86 (Cmdr. G.R. Luker), 100 aircraft
 VBF-86: 36 F4U Corsair fighters
 VF-86: 34 F6F Hellcat fighters
 VB-86: 15 SB2C Helldiver dive bombers
 VT-86: 15 TBM Avenger torpedo bombers
 Bennington (Capts. J.B. Sykes and B.L. Braun)
 Air Group 82 (Cmdr. G.L. Heap), 92 aircraft
 VF-82: 37 F6F Hellcat fighters
 VB-82: 15 SB2C Helldiver dive bombers
 VT-82: 15 TBM Avenger torpedo bombers
 VMF-112: 18 F4U Corsair fighters
 VMF-123: 17 F4U Corsair fighters

 2 light carriers
  (Capts. John Perry and W.G. Tomlinson)
 Air Group 30 (Lt. Cmdr. D.A. Clark), 34 aircraft
 VF-30: 25 F6F Hellcat fighters
 VT-30:   9 TBM Avenger torpedo bombers
  (Capt. M.H. Kernodle)
 Air Group 45 (Cmdr. G.E. Schecter), 34 aircraft
 VF-45: 25 F6F Hellcat fighters
 VT-45:   9 TBM Avenger torpedo bombers

 Battleship Division 8 (Rear Admiral John F. Shafroth Jr.)
 3 fast battleships
  (Capts. C.F. Stillman and Charles B. Momsen) - flagship
  (Capts. W.W. Warlick and John R. Redman)
  (Capts. T.J. Keliher and Francis P. Old)

 Cruiser Division 10 (Rear Admiral Lloyd J. Wiltse)
 2 heavy cruisers
  (Capt. C.K. Fink)
  (Capt. John E. Gingrich)

 Cruiser Division 14 (Rear Admiral Francis E. M. Whiting)
 3 light cruisers
 Vincennes (Capt. W.G. Lalor)
 Miami (Capt. Thomas H. Binford)
 Vicksburg (Capt. W.C. Vose)
 1 anti-aircraft light cruiser
  (Capts. J.F. Donovan and G.H. Bahm)

 Screen
 21 destroyers
 9  (6 x 5-in. main battery): Dehaven, Mansfield, Lyman K. Swenson, Collett, Maddox, Blue, Brush, Taussig, Samuel N. Moore 12  (5 x 5-in. main battery): Wedderburn, Twining, Stockham, John Rodgers, Stevens, Harrison, McKee, Murray, Sigsbee, Ringgold, Schroeder, Dashiell Task Group 58.2

 Rear Admirals Ralph E. Davison and Gerald F. Bogan

 3 fleet carriers
 Enterprise (Capt. Grover B. H. Hall)
 Night Air Group 90 (Cmdr. W.I. Martin), 53 aircraft
 VFN-90: 32 F6F Hellcat fighters
 VTN-90: 21 TBM Avenger torpedo bombers
  (Capt. Leslie E. Gehres)
 Air Group 5 (Cmdr. E.B. Parker Jr.), 107 aircraft
 VF-5: 19 F6F Hellcat fighters

 VB-5: 8 SB2C Helldiver, 11 SBW Helldiver dive bombers
 VT-5: 6 TBF Avenger, 10 TBM Avenger torpedo bombers
 VMF-214: 18 F4U Corsair fighters
 VMF-452: 18 F4U Corsair fighters
  (Capt. F.L. Baker)
 Air Group 12 (Cmdrs. C.L. Crommelin (KIA), E.J. Pawka, USNR), 97 aircraft
 VF-12: 33 F6F Hellcat fighters
 VBF-12: 24 F6F Hellcat fighters
 VB-12: 15 SB2C Helldiver dive bombers
 VT-12: 15 TBM Avenger torpedo bombers

 1 light cruiser
  (Capt. H.C. Fitz)

 Screen
 8  destroyers (5 x 5-in. main battery): Miller, Owen, Stephen Potter, Hickox, Hunt, Lewis Hancock, Marshall, Tingey

 Task Group 58.3

 Rear Admiral Frederick C. Sherman

 3 fleet carriers
  (Capt. C.W. Wieber)
 Air Group 83 (Cmdr. Harmon Tischer Utter), 102 aircraft
 VF-83: 36 F6F Hellcat fighters
 VBF-83: 36 F4U Corsair fighters
 VB-83: 15 SB2C Helldiver dive bombers
 VT-83: 15 TBM Avenger torpedo bombers
  (Capt. G.A Seitz)
 Air Group 84 (Cmdr. G.M. Ottinger), 93 aircraft
 VF-84: 27 F4U Corsair fighters, 10 F6F Hellcat fighters
 VB-84: 15 SB2C Helldiver dive bombers
 VT-84: 15 TBM Avenger torpedo bombers
 VMF-221: 18 F4U Corsair fighters
 VMF-451: 18 F4U Corsair fighters
  (Capt. R.F. Hickey)
 Air Group 6 (Cmdr. H.L. Miller), 94 aircraft
 VF-6: 36 F6F Hellcat fighters
 VBF-6: 36 F6F Hellcat fighters
 VB-6: 12 SB2C Helldiver dive bombers
 VT-6: 10 TBM Avenger torpedo bombers

 2 light carriers
  (Capt. W.W. Smith)
 Air Group 29 (Lt. Cmdr. W.E. Eder), 33 aircraft
 VF-29: 24 F6F Hellcat fighters
 VT-29:   9 TBM Avenger torpedo bombers
  (Capt. J.B. Heath)
 Air Group 47 (Cmdr. Walker Etheridge and Lt. Cmdr. A.H. Clancy), 36 aircraft
 VF-47: 24 F6F Hellcat fighters
 VT-47: 12 TBM Avenger torpedo bombers

 Battleship Division 6 (Rear Admiral Thomas R. Cooley)
 2 fast battleships
  (Capts. Oswald S. Colclough and Byron H. Hanlon)
  (Capts. Roscoe F. Good and Francis X. McInerney)

  Cruiser Division 17 (Rear Admiral J. Cary Jones)
 1 heavy cruiser
  (Capt. C.B. McVay)
 4 light cruisers
  (Capts. R.B. Tuggle and James H. Doyle)
  (Capts. F.L. Johnson and T.J. Kelley)
  (Capts. George C. Dyer and W.V. Hamilton)
  (Capt. R.L. Porter)

 Screen
 17 destroyers
 9  (6 x 5-in. main battery): Ault, English, Charles S. Sperry, Waldron, Haynsworth, Wallace L. Lind, John W. Weeks, Hank, Borie 8  (5 x 5-in. main battery): Erben, Walker, Hale, Stembel, Black, Bullard, Kidd, Chauncey Task Group 58.4

 Rear Admiral Arthur W. Radford

 2 fleet carriers
  (Capts. T.S. Combs and Walter F. Boone)
 Air Group 9 (Cmdr. P.H. Torrey and Lt. Cmdr. H.N. Houck, USNR), 95 aircraft
 VF-9: 40 F6F Hellcat fighters
 VBF-9: 33 F6F Hellcat fighters
 VB-9: 15 SB2C Helldiver dive bombers
 VT-9:   7 TBM Avenger torpedo bombers
  (Capt. G.E. Short)
 Air Group 10 (Cmdr. J.J. Hyland), 96 aircraft
 VF-10: 30 F4U Corsair, 6 F6F Hellcat fighters
 VBF-10: 36 F4U Corsair fighters
 VB-10: 15 SB2C Helldiver dive bombers
 VT-10: 15 TBF Avenger torpedo bombers
 2 light carriers
 Langley (Capt. J.F. Wegforth)
 Air Group 23 (Lt. Cmdr. Merlin Paddock, USNR (KIA) and Cmdr. J.J. Southerland), 34 aircraft
 VF-23: 25 F6F Hellcat fighters
 VT-23:   9 TBM Avenger torpedo bombers
 Independence (Capt. N.M. Kindell)
 Air Group 46 (Cmdr. C.W. Rooney), 33 aircraft
 VF-46: 25 F6F Hellcat fighters
 VT-46:    8 TBM Avenger torpedo bombers

 Battleship Division 9 (Rear Admiral Edward W. Hanson and Louis E. Denfeld)
 3 fast battleships
  (Capt. Earl E. Stone and John W. Roper)
  (Capts. W.M. Callaghan and Stuart S. Murray)
  (Capt. Edmund T. Wooldridge)

 Cruiser Division 16 (Rear Admiral Francis S. Low)
 2 large cruisers
  (Capt. K.H. Noble)
  (Capt. Leland P. Lovette)
 1 light cruiser
  (Capt. J.B. Griggs)
 3 anti-aircraft light cruisers
  (Capt. C.R. Will)
  (Capt. K.S. Reed)
  (Capt. W.E.A. Mullan)

 Screen
 17  destroyers (5 x 5-in. main battery): Remey, Norman Scott, Mertz, Monssen, McGowan, McNair, Melvin, McCord, Trathen, Hazelwood, Heermann, Haggard, Franks, Hailey, Cushing, Colahan, Uhlmann, Benham Allied logistics and support vessels 

 Support and Service Units (Task Force 50) 

 Search and Reconnaissance Group (Task Group 50.5)
 Commodore Dixwell Ketcham
 3 seaplane tenders
 Hamlin (Capt. G.A. McLean)
 VPB-208 (Lt. Cmdr. A.J. Sintic, USNR)
 12 Martin PBM Mariner patrol bomber flying boats
 St. George (Capt. R.G. Armstrong)
 VPB-18 (Lt. Cmdr. R.R. Boettcher)
 12 Martin PBM Mariner patrol bomber flying boats
 Chandeleur (Cmdr. J.S. Tracy)
 VPB-21 (Lt. Cmdrs. J.E. Dougherty & J.D. Wright)
 12 Martin PBM Mariner patrol bomber flying boats
 3 small seaplane tenders
 Yakutat (Cmdr. G.K. Fraser)
 Onslow (Cmdr. A.D. Schwarz)
 Shelikof (Cmdr. R.E. Stanley)
 VPB-27 (Lt. Cmdr. E.N. Chase)
 12 Martin PBM Mariner patrol bomber flying boats
 Bering Strait (Cmdr. W.D. Innis)
 VH-3 (Lt. Cmdr. W.D. Bonvillian)
 6 Martin PBM Mariner patrol bomber flying boats
 2 destroyer seaplane tenders: Thornton, Gillis 1  destroyer: Williamson Logistics Support Group Fifth Fleet (Task Group 50.8)
 Rear Admiral Donald B. Beary in light cruiser Detroit Support escort carriers
 Shamrock Bay (Capts. F.T. Ward and J.E. Leeper)
 VC-94 (Lt. Cmdr. J.F. Patterson, USNR (KIA) and Lt. L.E. Terry)
 18 FM-2 Wildcat fighters
 12 TBM Avenger torpedo bombers
 Makassar Strait (Capt. Herbert D. Riley)
 VC-97 (Lt. Cmdr. M.T. Whittier, USNR)
 14 FM-2 Wildcat fighters
 12 TBM Avenger torpedo bombers
 CVE Plane Transport Unit (Task Unit 50.8.4)
 Attu (Capt. H.F. MacComsey)
 Admiralty Islands (Capt. M.E.A. Gouin)
 Bougainville (Capt. C.A. Bond)
 Windham Bay (Capt. G.T. Mundorff)
 Logistics and Support Vessels
 49 oilers: Cuyama, Brazos, Cimarron, Platte, Sabine, Kaskaskia, Guadalupe, Chicopee, Housatonic, Merrimack, Kankakee, Lackawanna, Monongahela, Tappahannock, Patuxent, Neches, Suamico, Tallulah, Ashtabula, Cacapon, Caliente, Chikaskia, Aucilla, Marias, Manatee, Nantahala, Severn, Taluga, Chipola, Tolovana, Pecos, Atascosa, Cache, Enoree, Escalante, Neshanic, Niobrara, Millicoma, Saranac, Cossatot, Cowanesque, Escambia, Cahaba, Mascoma, Ocklawaha, Ponaganset, Sebec, Tomahawk, Anacostia 16 ammunition ships: Akutan, Firedrake, Lassen, Mauna Loa, Shasta, Vesuvius, Wrangell, Canada Victory, Bedford Victory, Bucyrus Victory, Manderson Victory, Las Vegas Victory, Logan Victory, Greenburg Victory, Pierre Victory, Hobbs Victory 9 cargo ships: Adhara, Alkaid, Alkes, Allegan, Appanoose, Fomalhaut, Matar, Mintaka, Rotanin 8 hospital ships: Bountiful, Comfort, Hope, Mercy, Relief, Samaritan, Solace, plus transport Wharton 6 reefers (store ships): Adria, Athanasia, Bridge, Latona, Lioba, Merapi 2 survey ships: Armistead Rust, Bowditch 2 stores-issue ships: Antares, Castor 9 gasoline tankers: Wabash, Genesee, Kishwaukee, Nemasket, Escatawpa, Hiwassee, Ontonagon, Yahara, Ponchatoula, Sacandaga 6 station tankers: Armadillo, Giraffe, Marmora, Moose, Whippet, LCI(L)-993
 10 repair sFhips: Vestal, Aristaeus, Nestor, Oceanus, Anchor, Clamp, Current, Deliver, Gear, Shackle 6 floating drydocks: ARD-13, ARD-22, ARD-27, ARD-28, AFD-14, AFDL-32
 12 fleet tugs: Arikara, Chickasaw, Cree, Lipan, Mataco, Menominee, Munsee, Pakana, Tawakoni, Tekesta, Tenino, Ute 4 ocean tugs, 3 ocean tugs (rescue)
 Screen: Screening vessels for the Logistics Group were assigned to TG 50.8 units as needed from a pool of 11 destroyers and 24 destroyer escorts.

 Japanese order of battle 
Japanese Combined Fleet
Admiral Soemu Toyoda

 Surface Special Attack Force 
Vice Admiral Seiichi Ito (KIA)
 Super battleship: Yamato Captain Kosaku Aruga (KIA)
 Destroyer Squadron 2 (Rear Admiral Keizo Komura)
 Light cruiser: Yahagi (Captain Tameichi Hara)
 Destroyer Division 41 (Capt. M. Yoshida): Fuyutsuki, Suzutsuki Destroyer Division 17 (Capt. K. Shintani – KIA): Isokaze, Hamakaze, Yukikaze Destroyer Division 21 (Capt. H. Kotaki – KIA): Asashimo, Kasumi, HatsushimoNaval vessels damaged and sunk at Okinawa
The following table lists the Allied naval vessels that received damage or were sunk in the Battle of Okinawa between 19 March - 30 July, 1945. The table lists a total of 147 damaged ships, five of which were damaged by enemy suicide boats, and another five  by mines.    One source estimated that total Japanese sorties during the entire Okinawa campaign exceeded 3,700, with a large percentage kamikaze, and that the attackers damaged slightly more than 200 Allied vessels, with 4900 naval officers and seamen killed and roughly 4,824 wounded or missing.  The USS Thorton is not listed as it was damaged as the result of a collision with another US ship.  Those ships in a pink background, and with an asterisk were sunk or had to be scuttled due to irreparable damage. Of those sunk, the majority were relatively smaller ships; these included destroyers of around 300-450 feet.  A few small cargo ships were also sunk, several containing munitions which caught fire.  Those ships whose names are preceded by a "#" pound sign, were scrapped or decommissioned as a result of damage

|-
| align="center" colspan=6|Allied Naval vessels damaged and sunk by Japanese forces at Okinawa, primarily kamikazes, 19 March - 30 July, 1945
|-
| align="center" style="border-style: none none solid solid; background: #e3e3e3"|Day
| align="center" style="border-style: none none solid solid; background: #e3e3e3"|Ship
| align="center" style="border-style: none none solid solid; background: #e3e3e3"|Type
| align="center" style="border-style: none none solid solid; background: #e3e3e3"|Cause
| align="center" style="border-style: none none solid solid; background: #e3e3e3"|Killed
| align="center" style="border-style: none none solid solid; background: #e3e3e3"|Wounded
|-
| 19 Mar 45
|  USS Franklin| Carrier
| Air Attack, 2 550 lb. bombs thru to hangar deck
| 724
| 265 
|-
| 19 Mar 45
| USS Wasp| Carrier
| Air Attack, bomb thru flight, & hangar decks
| 101
| 269 
|-
| 20 Mar 45
| USS Halsey Powell| Destroyer
| Air Attack, kamikaze
| 12
| 29
|-
| 26 Mar 45
| style="background:pink;"|*USS Halligan| Destroyer
| Mine, 3 miles SE of Maye Shima, exploded 2 forward magazines, bow blown off
| 153
| 39
|-
| 26 Mar 45
| USS Kimberly| Destroyer
| Air Attack, kamikaze
| 4
| 57
|-
| 26 Mar 45
| USS Nevada| Battleship
| Air Attack, kamikaze
| 11
| 49
|-
| 26 Mar 45
| USS Biloxi| Light Cruiser
| Air Attack, kamikaze
| 0
| 0
|-
| 27 Mar 45
| USS Murray| Destroyer
| Air Attack, bomb
| 1
| 116
|-
| 27 Mar 45
| USS O'Brian| Destroyer
| Air Attack, Val kamikaze w/bomb
| 50
| 76
|-
| 28 Mar 45
| style="background:pink;"|* USS Skylark| Small Minesweeper
| Mine, struck mines twice off Hagushi beaches, 1st amidships
| 5
| 25
|-
| 28 Mar 45
| USS LSM(R)-188| Landing Ship
| Air Attack by single kamikaze
| 15
| 32
|-
| 29 Mar 45
| USS Wyandot| Attack Cargo Ship
| Mine, possibly bomb
| 0
| 1
|-
| 31 Mar 45
| USS Indianapolis| Cruiser
| Air Attack, bomb thru fuel tanks
| 9
| 20
|-
| 1 Apr 45
| USS Adams| Destroyer Minelayer
| Air Attack, kamikaze w/bombs to fantail
| 0
| 0
|-
| 1 Apr 45
|  USS Alpine| Attack Transport
| Air Attack, bomb and kamikaze
| 16
| 27
|-
| 1 Apr 45
| USS Hinsdale| Attack Transport
| Air Attack, kamikaze w/bombs hit waterline
| 16
| 39
|-
| 1 Apr 45
| #USS LST-884| Tank Landing Ship
| Air Attack, kamikaze, scuttled May 6
| 24
| 21
|-
| 2 Apr 45
| style="background:pink;"|*USS Dickerson| Destroyer
| Air Attack, kamikaze Nick crashed bridge, towed, scuttled
| 54
| 23
|-
| 2 Apr 45
| USS Goodhue| Attack Transport
| Air Attack, kamikaze aimed at bridge glanced mainmast, hit cargo boom, gun tubs, over side
| 24
| 119
|-
| 2 Apr 45
| USS Henrico| Attack Transport
| Air Attack, kamikaze w/bombs hit bridge
| 49
| 125
|-
| 2 Apr 45
| USS Achernar| Attack Cargo Ship
| Air Attack, kamikaze w/bomb hit starboard
| 5
| 41
|-
| 3 Apr 45
| USS Wake Island| Escort Carrier
| Air Attack, kamikaze blew below waterline
| 0
| 0
|-
| 3 Apr 45
| USS Pritchett| Destroyer
| Air Attack, 500 lb bomb
| 0
| 0
|-
| 3 Apr 45
| USS Foreman| Destroyer
| Air Attack, bomb passed thru her bottom, exploded below
| 0
| 3
|-
| 3 Apr 45
| USS LST-599| Tank Landing Ship
| Air Attack, kamikaze thru main deck, fires 
| 0
| 21
|-
| 3 Apr 45
| #USS LCT-876| Landing Craft Tank
| Air Attack
| 0
| 2
|-
| 4 Apr 45
| style="background:pink;"|*USS LCI(G)-82| Landing Craft, Infantry
| Suicide Boat
| 8
| 11
|-
| 5 Apr 45
| USS Nevada| Battleship
| Coastal Battery
| 2
| 16
|-
| 6 Apr 45
| style="background:pink;"|*USS Bush| Destroyer
| Air Attack, 3 kamikaze hits 2 between stacks, blew forward engine room, broke in half 
| 94
| 32
|-
| 6 Apr 45
| style="background:pink;"|*USS Colhoun| Destroyer
| Air Attack, 4 kamikaze hits, bombs blew forward, & aft fire rooms at waterline
| 35
| 21
|-
| 6 Apr 45
| USS Howorth| Destroyer
| Air Attack, kamikaze struck superstructure, fires put out
| 9
| 14
|-
| 6 Apr 45
| USS Hyman| Destroyer
| Air Attack, kamikaze Hampton hit torpedo tubes twixt stacks
| 10
| 40
|-
| 6 Apr 45
| #USS Leutze| Destroyer
| Air Attack, kamikaze blew at fantail, bad flooding
| 7
| 34
|-
| 6 Apr 45
| #USS Morris| Destroyer
| Air Attack, kate kamikaze portside 
| 0
| 5
|-
| 6 Apr 45
| USS Mulaney| Destroyer
| Air Attack, kamikaze hit depth charges
| 13
| 45
|-
| 6 Apr 45
| #USS Newcomb| Destroyer
| Air Attack, multiple kamikazes 
| 40
| 24
|-
| 6 Apr 45
| USS Haynsworth| Destroyer
| Air Attack, kamikaze 
| 7
| 25
|-
| 6 Apr 45
| #USS Witter| Destroyer Escort
| Starboard waterline kamikaze 
| 0
| 5
|-
| 6 Apr 45
| USS Fieberling| Destroyer
| Air Attack, kamikaze near miss
| 6
| 6
|-
| 6 Apr 45
| style="background:pink;"|*USS Emmons| Destroyer Minesweeper
| Air Attack, 5 kamikaze hits, scuttled 7 April
| 64
| 71
|-
| 6 Apr 45
| style="background:pink;"| *USS Rodman| Destroyer Minesweeper
| Air Attack, 4 kamikaze hits 
| 16
| 20
|-
| 6 Apr 45
| USS Defense| Small Minesweeper
| Air Attack, two kamikaze strikes
| 0
| 9
|-
| 6 Apr 45
| style="background:pink;"|*USS LST-447| Landing Ship
| Air Attack, kamikaze hit close above waterline, bomb blew
| 5
| 17
|-
| 6 Apr 45
| style="background:pink;"|*SS Hobbs Victory| Small Cargo
| Air Attack, kamikaze struck port, flames ignited ammunition
| 15
| 3
|-
| 6 Apr 45
| style="background:pink;"|* SS Logan Victory| Small Cargo
| Air Attack, kamikaze struck superstructure, flames ignited ammunition
| 16
| 11
|-
| 7 Apr 45
| USS Hancock| Carrier
| Air Attack, cartwheeling kamikaze 
| 72
| 82
|-
| 7 Apr 45
| USS Maryland| Battleship
| Air Attack, kamikaze hit starboard 
| 16
| 37
|-
| 7 Apr 45
| USS Bennett| Destroyer
| Air Attack, kamikaze hit engine room 
| 3
| 18
|-
| 7 Apr 45
| USS Wesson| Destroyer
| Air Attack, kamikaze starboard 
| 8
| 23
|-
| 7 Apr 45
| style="background:pink;"|*USS PGM-18| Small Gunboat
| Mine, powerful explosion 
| 14
| 14
|-
| 7 Apr 45
| style="background:pink;"|*YMS-103| Small Minesweeper
| Mine, struck two mines, blowing off her bow and stem rescuing PGM-18
| 5
| 0
|-
| 8 Apr 1945
| USS Gregory| Destroyer
| Air Attack, port kamikaze amidships near waterline 
| 0
| 2
|-
| 8 Apr 45
| USS YMS-92| Small Sweeper
| Air Attack 
| 0
| 0
|-
| 9 Apr 45
| USS Charles J. Badger| Destroyer
| Suicide Boat threw depth charge or mine
| 0
| 0
|-
| 9 Apr 45
| USS Sterett| Destroyer
| Air Attack, kamikaze hit starboard at waterline 
| 0
| 9
|-
| 9 Apr 45
| USS Hopping| Destroyer Transport
| Coastal Battery, damaging hits off Buckner Bay
| 2
| 18
|-
| 11 Apr 45
| USS Kidd| Destroyer
| Air Attack, kamikaze 
| 38
| 55
|-
| 12 Apr 45
| USS Tennessee| Battleship
| Air Attack, kamikaze hit signal bridge
| 25
| 104
|-
| 12 Apr 45
| style="background:pink;"|*USS Mannert L. Abele| Destroyer
| Air Attack, kamikaze
| 79
| 35
|-
| 12 Apr 45
| USS Purdy| Destroyer
| Air Attack, splashed kamikaze bomb skidded in
| 13
| 27
|-
| 12 Apr 45
| USS Cassin Young| Destroyer
| Air Attack, kamikaze hit foremast
| 1
| 59
|-
| 12 Apr 45
| USS Zellars| Destroyer
| Air Attack, kamikaze crashed port, bomb blew
| 29
| 37
|-
| 12 Apr 45
|  USS Rall| Destroyer
| Air Attack, kamikaze starboard aft, bomb blew
| 21
| 38
|-
| 12 Apr 45
| USS Whitehurst| Destroyer Escort
| Air Attack, kamikaze w/bomb crashed pilot house
| 37
| 37
|-
| 12 Apr 45
| USS Lindsey| Destroyer Minelayer
| Air Attack, 2 kamikaze Val strikes
| 56
| 51
|-
| 12 Apr 45
| USS LSM(R)-189| Landing Ship
| Air Attack, kamikaze
| 0
| 4
|-
| 12 Apr 45
| style="background:pink;"|*USS LCS(L)-33| Landing Craft
| Air Attack, kamikaze Val amidships
| 4
| 29
|-
| 12 Apr 45
| USS LCS(L)-57| Landing Craft
| Air Attack, 3 kamikaze strikes
| 2
| 6
|-
| 14 Apr 45
| USS Sigsbee| Destroyer
| Air Attack, kamikaze damaged port engine
| 4
| 74
|-
| 16 Apr 45
| USS Intrepid| Carrier
| Air Attack, kamikaze crashed deck, fires put out
| 10
| 87
|-
| 16 Apr 45
| USS Bryant| Destroyer
| Air Attack, kamikaze to bridge, w/explosion
| 34
| 33
|-
| 16 Apr 45
| USS Laffey| Destroyer
| Air Attack, multiple kamikaze hits
| 31
| 72
|-
| 16 Apr 45
| style="background:pink;"|*USS Pringle| Destroyer
| Air Attack, kamikaze Val hit abaft stack No. 1, explosion, broke in half
| 65
| 110
|-
| 16 Apr 45
| USS Bowers| Destroyer Escort
| Air Attack, kamikaze to bridge, bomb hit pilot house
| 48
| 56
|-
| 16 Apr 45
| #USS Harding| Destroyer Minesweeper
| Air Attack, kamikaze struck side near bridge
| 22
| 10
|-
| 16 Apr 45
| USS Hobson| Destroyer Minesweeper
| Air Attack, near miss kamikaze's bomb veered in
| 4
| 8
|-
| 16 Apr 45
| USS LCS(L)-116| Landing Craft
| Air Attack, kamikaze hit aft gun mount 
| 12
| 12
|-
| 18 Apr 45
| USS LSM-28| Landing Ship
| Air Attack 
| 0
| 0
|-
| 22 Apr 45
| USS Isherwood| Destroyer
| Air Attack, kamikaze w/bomb crashed gun mount
| 42
| 41
|-
| 22 Apr 45
| style="background:pink;"|*USS Swallow| Small Sweeper
| Air attack, bad kamikaze hit flooded her, 3 mins sunk
| 2
| 9
|-
| 22 Apr 45
| USS LCS(L)-15| Landing Craft
| Air Attack
| 15
| 11
|-
| 27 Apr 45
| #USS Hutchins| Destroyer
| Suicide Boat explosive blew close
| 0
| 0
|-
| 27 Apr 45
| #USS Rathburne| Destroyer
| Air Attack, kamikaze hit port bow waterline 
| 0
| 0
|-
| 27 Apr 45
| style="background:pink;"|*SS Canada Victory| Small Cargo
| Air Attack, kamikaze hit stern, lit ammo, sunk 10 mins
| 12
| 27
|-
| 28 Apr 45
| USS Pinkney| Destroyer
| Air Attack, kamikaze hit aft of superstructure, lit ammo
| 35
| 12
|-
| 28 Apr 45
| USS Comfort| Hospital Ship
| Air Attack, kamikaze thru 3 decks to surgery
| 30
| 48
|-
| 29 Apr 45
| #USS Haggard| Destroyer
| Air Attack, kamikaze went thru hull,blew engine room
| 11
| 40
|-
| 29 Apr 45
| USS Hazelwood| Destroyer
| Air Attack, kamikaze zero hit port bridge
| 46
| 26
|-
| 29 Apr 45
| #USS LCS(L)-37| Landing Craft
| Suicide Boat
| 0
| 4
|-
| 30 Apr 45
| USS Terror| Minelayer
| Air Attack, kamikaze blew thru main deck
| 48
| 123
|-
| 3 May 45
| style="background:pink;"|*USS Little| Destroyer
| Air attack, 5 kamikaze strikes
| 30
| 79
|-
| 3 May 45
| #USS Aaron Ward| Destroyer Minelayer
| Air Attack; 3 kamikaze hits and bomb frags
| 45
| 49
|-
| 3 May 45
| USS Macomb| Destroyer Minelayer
| Air Attack, kamikaze
| 7
| 14
|-
| 3 May 45
| style="background:pink;"|*USS LSM(R)-195| Landing Ship
| Air Attack, kamikaze hit rockets, sunk 
| 8
| 16
|-
| 4 May 45
| USS Hopkins| Destroyer Minesweeper
| Air Attack, Glancing blow by burning kamikaze
| 0
| 1
|-
| 4 May 45
| #USS Sangamon| Escort Carrier
| Air Attack, kamikaze & bomb blew thru flight deck
| 46
| 116
|-
| 4 May 45
| USS Birmingham| Light Cruiser
| Air Attack, kamikaze hit forward
| 51
| 81
|-
| 4 May 45
| USS Ingraham| Destroyer
| Air Attack, kamikaze above port waterline, bomb blew 
| 14
| 37
|-
| 4 May 45
| style="background:pink;"|*USS Luce| Destroyer
| Air Attack, 1st kamikaze bomb hit, 2nd kamikaze struck aft
| 149
| 94
|-
| 4 May 45
| style="background:pink;"|*USS Morrison| Destroyer
| Air Attack, 1st kamikaze hit bridge, then 3 more hit 
| 159
| 102
|-
| 4 May 45
| USS Shea| Destroyer
| Air Attack Ohka kamikaze thru starboard bridge
| 27
| 91
|-
| 4 May 45
| USS Carina| Cargo Ship
| Suicide Boat ramming caused explosion       
| 0
| 6
|-
| 4 May 45
| style="background:pink;"|*USS LSM(R)-190| Landing Ship
| Air Attack, kamikaze set off her rockets 
| 13
| 18
|-
| 4 May 45
| style="background:pink;"|*USS LSM(R)-194| Landing Ship
| Air Attack
| 13
| 23
|-
| 9 May 45
| #USS England| Destroyer
| Air Attack, kamikaze dive bomber 
| 35
| 27
|-
| 9 May 45
| #USS Oberrender| Destroyer Escort
| Air Attack, kamikaze hit starboard gun mount, bomb thru main deck
| 8
| 53
|-
| 11 May 45
| USS Bunker Hill| Carrier
| Air Attack, 3 kamikaze hits with bombs thru flight deck
| 396
| 264
|-
| 11 May 45
| #USS Hugh W. Hadley| Destroyer
| Air Attack, Aft bomb, an Ohka, and 2 more kamikazes struck
| 28
| 67
|-
| 11 May 45
| #USS Evans| Destroyer
| Air Attack, Struck by 4 kamikazes, fires put out
| 30
| 29
|-
| 11 May 45
| USS LCS(L)-88| Landing Craft
| Air Attack  
| 7
| 9
|-
| 13 May 45
| USS Enterprise| Fast Carrier
| Air Attack, 2 kamikazes, struck port, & under starboard bow
| 13
| 68
|-
| 13 May 45
| USS Bache| Destroyer
| Air Attack, kamikaze hit, bomb exploded amidships just above main deck
| 41
| 32
|-
| 13 May 45
| USS Bright| Destroyer Escort
| Air Attack, kamikaze zero hit fantail, bomb exploded
| 0
| 2
|-
| 17 May 45
| USS Douglas H. Fox| Destroyer
| 2 kamikaze strikes, one to forward gun mounts, one to fantail
| 9
| 35
|-
| 18 May 45
| style="background:pink;"|*USS Longshaw| Destroyer
| Coastal Battery, 4 hits, one ignited magazine, blew off bow back to bridge
| 86
| 97
|-
| 18 May 45
| style="background:pink;"|*USS LST-808| Landing Ship Tank
| Air Attack 
| 11
| 11
|-
| 20 May 45
| #USS Chase| Destroyer Escort
| Air Attack, Splashed kamikaze skidded in, bombs opened hull, w/flooding 
| 0
| 35
|-
| 20 May 45
| #USS Thatcher| Destroyer
| Air Attack, kamikaze Oscar struck aft of bridge, large hole
| 14
| 53
|-
| 20 May 45
| #USS John C. Butler| Destroyer Escort
| Air Attack, kamikaze hit to mast and antennas
| 0
| 0
|-
| 25 May 45
| USS Stormes| Destroyer
| Air Attack, crashed aft torpedo mount, bomb blew large hole, flooded aft
| 21
| 6
|-
| 25 May 45
| USS O'Neill| Destroyer Escort
| Air Attack, kamikaze 
| 0
| 16
|-
| 25 May 45
| USS Butler| Destroyer Minesweeper
| Air Attack, kamikaze bombs exploded under keel
| 0
| 15
|-
| 25 May 45
| #USS Spectacle| Small Minesweeper
| Air Attack, kamikaze crashed port gun tub causing fires 
| 29
| 6
|-
| 25 May 45
| style="background:pink;"|*USS Barry| Destroyer Transport
| Air Attack, kamikaze badly crashed starboard side, fires, abandoned
| 0
| 30
|-
| 25 May 45
| style="background:pink;"|*USS Bates| Destroyer
| Air Attack, 2 kamikaze hits, fires, abandoned, towed, later sank
| 21
| 35
|-
| 25 May 45
| USS Roper| Destroyer
| Air Attack, kamikaze hit off Hanagushi, Okinawa 
| 1
| 10
|-
| 25 May 45
| style="background:pink;"|*LSM-135| Landing Ship
| Air Attack, kamikaze caused fires, beached, abandoned
| 11
| 10
|-
| 25 May 45
| SS William B. Allison, aka USS Inca)

| Cargo Ship, Liberty Ship
| Air Attack, Aerial Torpedo off Nakagusuku Wan   
| 8
| 2
|-
| 27 May 45
| USS Braine| Destroyer
| Air Attack, 2 kamikazes, 1st hit bridge, and 2nd hit amidships
| 66
| 78
|-
| 27 May 45
| #USS Forrest| Destroyer Minesweeper
| Air Attack, kamikaze crashed starboard side waterline 
| 5
| 13
|-
| 27 May 45
| USS Rednour| Transport
| Air Attack, 2 kmaikazes hits, one made 10 foot hole in main deck
| 3
| 13
|-
| 27 May 45
| USS Loy| Destroyer Escort
| Air Attack, kamikaze near miss sprayed fragments
| 3
| 15
|-
| 27 May 45
| LCS(L)-119| Landing Craft
| Air Attack
| 12
| 6
|-
| 28 May 45
| style="background:pink;"|*USS Drexler| Destroyer Escort
| Air Attack, 1st kamikaze Frances hit topside, 2nd Francis w/bombs crashed superstructure
| 158
| 51
|-
| 28 May 45
| USS Sandoval| Attack Transport
| Air Attack, kamikaze hit portside of wheelhouse
| 8
| 26
|-
| 29 May 45
| USS Shubrick| Destroyer
| Air Attack, kamikaze bomb hit starboard causing hole, exploding depth charge
| 32
| 28
|-
| 3 June 45
| #USS LCI(L)-90| Landing Craft Infantry
| Air Attack, kamikaze 
| 1
| 7
|-
| 6 June 45
| #USS J. William Ditter| Destroyer Minelayer
| Air Attack, 1st kamikaze glanced, 2nd hit port near main deck
| 10
| 27
|-
| 6 Jun 45
| USS Harry F. Bauer| Destroyer Minelayer
| Air Attack,  kamikaze hit superstructure
| 0
| 0
|-
| 10 Jun 45
| style="background:pink;"|*USS William D. Porter| Destroyer
| Air Attack, splashed kamikaze Val'sbomb exploded close underwater
| 0
| 61
|-
| 11 Jun 45
| USS LCS(L)-122| Landing Craft
| Air Attack kamikaze hit conning tower base, bomb fragments caused fires
| 11
| 29
|-
| 16 Jun 45
| style="background:pink;"|*USS Twiggs| Destroyer
| Air Attack, splashed kamikaze and bomb blew in hull plating, w/structural damage
| 126
| 34
|-
| 21 Jun 45
| USS Halloran| Destroyer Escort
| Air Attack, splashed kamikaze's bomb struck
| 3
| 24
|-
| 21 Jun 45
| USS Curtiss| Seaplane Tender
| Air Attack, kamikaze and bomb ripped 2 holes in hull and blew 
| 41
| 28
|-
| 21 Jun 45
| style="background:pink;"|*USS LSM-59| Landing Ship
| Air Attack, kamikaze strike while towing USS Barry, sank in 4 minutes
| 2
| 8
|-
| 22 Jun 45
| USS LSM-213| Landing Ship
| Air Attack, kamikaze strike at Kimmu Wan, hull damage  
| 3
| 10
|-
| 22 Jun 45
| USS LST-534| Landing Ship Tank
| Air Attack, While offloading on Nagagusuku Wan, kamikaze hit bow doors, tank deck
| 3
| 35
|-
| 29 Jul 45
| style="background:pink;"|*USS Callaghan| Destroyer
| Air Attack, bi-plane kamikaze hit,its bomb blew aft engine room, sunk
| 47
| 73
|-
| 30 Jul 45
| USS Cassin Young''
| Destroyer
| Air Attack, kamikaze hit forward, earlier hit April 12
| 22
| 45

Notes

References

See also 
 List of ships damaged by kamikaze attack
 List of Allied vessels struck by Japanese special attack weapons

Bibliography 
 
 
 

April 1945 events
Battle of Okinawa
Conflicts in 1945
Naval aviation operations and battles
Naval battles of World War II involving Japan
Naval battles of World War II involving the United States
Pacific Ocean theatre of World War II
Royal Navy in World War II
United States Navy in World War II
World War II orders of battle
Naval battles of World War II involving New Zealand
Naval battles of World War II involving Canada